Agnes Margrétardóttir Sigurðardóttir (born 19 October 1954) is an Icelandic prelate who is the current Bishop of Iceland. She is the first woman to be elected a Bishop of the Church of Iceland.

Biography 
Agnes was born in Ísafjörður.  She has the degree of Cand. theol., University of Iceland (1981). From 1999 and before her election, she served as the dean of the Western Fjords.
Agnes Sigurðardóttir is divorced. She has three children. She has been active in Iceland's music life, playing the piano and organ and singing in choirs.

References

External links 
 Website Trúin og lífið 
 First Icelandic woman Bishop, on Lögberg-Heimskringla - The Icelandic Community Newspaper

1954 births
Living people
Women Lutheran bishops
Agnes M. Sigudardottir
21st-century Lutheran bishops
Agnes M. Sigudardottir
Agnes M. Sigudardottir